Old Man is a 2022 American horror thriller film directed by Lucky McKee from a screenplay by Joel Veach. The film stars Stephen Lang and Marc Senter.

Synopsis

When a lost hiker stumbles upon an erratic old man living in the woods, he could never have imagined the nightmare that awaits.

Cast
 Stephen Lang as Old Man
 Marc Senter as Joe
 Liana Wright-Mark as Genie
 Patch Darragh as Bible Salesman

Production
Principal photography began on January 20, 2021 and ended on March 10, 2021 in Newburgh, New York.

Reception
Old Man received mixed reviews. On the review aggregator website Rotten Tomatoes, the film has a 62% approval rating, based on 26 reviews, with an average rating of 5.5/10. The website's consensus reads, "Stephen Lang is as magnetic as ever, but his finely layered performance isn't quite enough to distract from Old Mans predictable story."

References

External links
 

2022 films
American horror thriller films
Films directed by Lucky McKee
Films produced by Aaron B. Koontz
2020s English-language films